The following is a list of shopping malls in Vietnam:

Ho Chi Minh City
 AEON Mall Tan Phu Celadon
 AEON Mall Binh Tan
 Crescent Mall
 Diamond Plaza
 Icon68 Shopping Center (Bitexco Financing Tower)
 Nowzone
 Estella Place
 Gigamall
 Pandora City
 Parkson Cantavil
 Parkson CT Plaza
 Parkson Flemington
 Parkson Hung Vuong Plaza
 Parkson Saigon Tourist Plaza
 Pearl Plaza
 Saigon Centre
 SC VivoCity
 Vincom Center Landmark 81
 Vincom Center Dong Khoi
 Vincom Mega Mall Thao Dien
 Vincom Plaza Go Vap
 Vincom Plaza Quang Trung
 Vincom Plaza Thu Duc
 Vincom Plaza Le Van Viet

Ha Noi
 AEON Mall Long Bien
 Parkson Viet Tower Plaza
 Trang Tien Plaza
 Vincom Center Ba Trieu
 Vincom Center Nguyen Chi Thanh
 Vincom Mega Mall Royal City
 Vincom Mega Mall Times City
 Vincom Plaza Long Bien
 Vincom Center Pham Ngoc Thach
 Vincom Plaza Bac Tu Liem
 Lotte Center Hanoi
 Mipec Tay Son
 Mipec Long Bien
 Indochina Plaza Hanoi
 The Garden Shopping Center

Da Nang
 Parkson Vinh Trung Plaza
 Vincom Plaza Ngo Quyen

Can Tho
 Vincom Plaza Hung Vuong
 Vincom Plaza Xuan Khanh

Hai Phong
 Parkson Thuy Duong Plaza
 Vincom Plaza Le Thanh Tong
 AEON mall Hai Phong Le Chan
 Vincom Imperia Hai Phong

An Giang
 Vincom Plaza Long Xuyen

Binh Duong
 AEON Mall Binh Duong Canary

Dak Lak
 Vincom Plaza Buon Ma Thuot

Dong Nai
 Vincom Plaza Bien Hoa

Phu Tho
 Vincom Plaza Viet Tri

Quang Ninh
 Vincom Plaza Ha Long

Thai Binh
 Vincom Plaza Ly Bon

Shopping malls in Vietnam
Vietnam
Shopping malls